Body Contact is a 1987 film directed by Bernard Rose. Its soundtrack is by Rick Fenn & Nick Mason. The BBC withdrew it from festivals and postponed its television screening after the Hungerford massacre.

References

External links
 

1987 films
British thriller drama films
Films directed by Bernard Rose (director)
1980s English-language films
1980s British films